The Raid (Cantonese: 財叔之橫掃千軍 Coi Suk Zi Waang Sou Cin Gwan = "Uncle's Sweeping Thousands") is a 1991 Hong Kong action film directed by Tsui Hark and Ching Siu-tung and based on the Hong Kong manhua, Uncle Choi, published by Michael Hui from 1958 to the mid-1970s. The film stars Dean Shek, who also served as the film's presenter, as the titular protagonist, while also co-starring Jacky Cheung, Tony Leung, Joyce Godenzi, Fennie Yuen, Paul Chu and Corey Yuen. The Raid is also Shek's final acting role before retiring from the film industry.

Plot
During the early years of the Republic of China, Qing emperor Puyi was controlled by the Japanese and he established the Manchurian government in the north with Japanese Commander Mesa and Yoshiko Kawashima.

Uncle Choi was once a soldier. Having studied medicine, he was entrusted one day by indigenous jungle people to save someone. On the thrilling road, he finds a group of soldiers who are victims of poison gas. Uncle Choi tries hard to save the colonel, but he dies. In the colonel's dying breath, he gives the task of resisting the enemy to Lieutenant Mang Tai-hoi. Uncle Choi had wanted to serve the country wholeheartedly, but was refused.

Later, Uncle Choi sneaks into the palace, posing as the cook, and re-meets Mang. Their mission is to find the "Cheung-kong #1" Tina. There, they raid the poison gas base map, but their actions were discovered by Mesa and Kawashima, so Uncle Choi, Tina and other people flee, and on the way Uncle Choi rescues his adopted daughter Nancy.

Uncle Choi and the gang prepare a large-scale attack on the poison gas base, after numerous fierce battles, they conquer in the end.

Cast
Dean Shek as Uncle Choi
Jacky Cheung as Bobo Bear
Tony Leung Ka-fai as Commander Mesa
Joyce Godenzi as Kam Pik-fai / Yoshiko Kawashima
Fennie Yuen as Tina
Paul Chu as Lieutenant Mang Tai-hoi
Corey Yuen as Brother Big Nose

Production
The Raid is based on the historical events of the 1930s, when Japanese occupied Manchuria have set up the last Chinese emperor, Puyi, as their puppet leader.

Release
The Raid was released on March 28, 1991 in Hong Kong. It was the 86th highest-grossing film in Hong Kong of the year, where it grossed a total of $3,694,660.

Reception
In her book The Cinema of Tsui Hark, Lisa Morton stated that "despite an innovative use of comic book-style artwork and storytelling techniques, The Raid is the weakest of the Ching Siu-Tung/Tsui Hark collaborations."

Notes

References

External links

The Raid at Hong Kong Cinemagic

The Raid film review at LoveHKFilm.com

1991 films
1991 action comedy films
1991 martial arts films
1990s adventure comedy films
Cultural depictions of Puyi
Hong Kong action comedy films
Hong Kong martial arts films
Hong Kong martial arts comedy films
1990s Cantonese-language films
Films based on Hong Kong comics
Films directed by Ching Siu-tung
Films directed by Tsui Hark
Films set in the 1930s
Films set in the Republic of China (1912–1949)
Live-action films based on comics
Second Sino-Japanese War films
1990s Hong Kong films